Numbers in Nepali Language

दश करोड – 10,00,00,000 (Hundred Million) – eight zeros

अर्ब – 1,00,00,00,000 (Billion) – nine zeros

दश अर्ब – 10,00,00,00,000 (Ten Billion) – ten zeros

खर्ब – 1,00,00,00,00,000 (Hundred Billion) – eleven zeros

दश खर्ब – 10,00,00,00,00,000 (Trillion) – twelve zeros

नील – 1,00,00,00,00,00,000 (ten trillion) – thirteen zeros

दश नील – 10,00,00,00,00,00,000 (hundred trillion) – fourteen zeros

पद्म – 1,00,00,00,00,00,00,000 (quadrillion) – fifteen zeros

दश पद्म – 10,00,00,00,00,00,00,000 (10 quadrillion) – sixteen zeros

शंख – 1,00,00,00,00,00,00,00,000 (hundred quadrillion) – seventeen zeros

दश शंख – 10,00,00,00,00,00,00,00,000 (quintillion) – eighteen zeros

क्रत्म –  1,00,00,00,00,00,00,00,00,000 (ten quintillion) – nineteen zeros

दश क्रत्म – 10,00,00,00,00,00,00,00,00,000 (hundred quintillion) – twenty zeros

Letter numerals

Nepalese manuscripts used a system of letters to stand for numbers, although the exact correspondence between letter and number value changed over time. In 1883, Cecil Bendall published a table of Nepalese letter numerals based on different dated Buddhist manuscripts from Cambridge University Library.

References

Nepali language